Weitek Corporation was an American chip-design company that originally focused on floating-point units for a number of commercial CPU designs. During the early to mid-1980s, Weitek designs could be found powering a number of high-end designs and parallel-processing supercomputers.

Weitek started in 1981, when several Intel engineers left to form their own company. Weitek developed math coprocessors for several systems, including those based on the Motorola 68000 family, the 1064 and 1164, and for Intel-based i286 systems, the 1067. Intel's own FPU design for the i386 fell far behind in development, and Weitek delivered the 1167 for them. The Weitek 1167 Floating Point Coprocessor provided the combination of Weitek 1163, 1164 and 1165 chipset.  Later upgrades to this design led to the 2167, 3167 and 4167. Weitek would later outfit FPUs to the early SPARC architecture such as the 3170 and 3172. Weitek FPUs had several differences compared to x87 offerings, lacking extended double precision but having a register-file rather than a stack-based model, or using memory-mapped IO as opposed to port-mapped IO.

As orders increased for supercomputer applications, Weitek found themselves seriously disadvantaged by their fab, which was becoming rather outdated. HP approached them with a deal to use their newer fabs. This proved advantageous for both, and soon HP's fabs were open to anyone. Weitek also worked with HP on the design of their latest PA-RISC design and sold their own version known as the RISC 8200, which was sold as an embedded design and had some use in laser printers.

In the late 1980s Weitek saw a new opportunity and started developing frame buffers for Sun Microsystems workstations. In the early 1990s they also introduced the SPARC POWER μP (as in "power-up"), a pin-compatible version of the SPARC processor. The μP could be dropped into existing SPARCstation 2 and SPARCstation IPX workstations and ran at 80 MHz, double the clock speed of the CPUs it replaced. The chip ran twice as fast internally, providing a boost of about 50–60% in overall speed, due to the bus not getting any faster. However, they did not pursue this concept with later generations of SPARC processors.

Weitek turned their frame-buffer experience to the PC market in the early 90s and introduced a series of SVGA multimedia chipsets known as the "POWER" systems. Consisting of two chips, one drawing the graphics known as the P9000 and another handling the output, the VideoPower 5x86, the POWER series was used in a number of third-party designs based on the VESA Local Bus standard. The P9001 moved to PCI and became fairly popular in 1994, known as the Viper in designs from Diamond and Orchid. The final generation, the P9100, combined the P9001 and 5286 into a single chip. Weitek adapters were fairly successful in the early days of the 486 market, but fell from use when less expensive systems were introduced by a host of new players in the mid-1990s.

During the early 1990s most CPU designs started including FPUs built into the system, basically "for free", and Weitek made a series of attempts to re-enter the low-end CPU and graphics driver market with their W464 (486) and W564 (P5) systems, which used the host machine's RAM as the frame buffer to lower costs. By 1995 the company was almost dead, and in late 1996 the remains were purchased by Rockwell's Semiconductor Systems and quickly disappeared.

References

External links
Weitek - the original home page, cached but largely un-functional
Weitek Sparc2 Upgrade Chip
Weitek chip images and information on cpu-collection.de

Computer companies established in 1981
Computer companies disestablished in 1996
Defunct computer companies of the United States
Defunct computer hardware companies
Defunct semiconductor companies of the United States
X86 microprocessors
Floating point